Jigme Dorje Palbar Bista (Tibetan: འཇིག་མེད་རྡོ་རྗེ་དཔལ་འབར།; Nepali: जिग्मे दोर्जे पलवर विष्ट; 1930 – 16 December 2016) was the unofficial King of Mustang (Tibetan: Lo Gyalpo, Nepalese: Mustang Rājā) between 1964 and 2008, until Monarchy, Semi-Monarchy, Vassals and Titular Kingship were abolished in Nepal. He was descendant in 25th generation of King A-ma-dpal bist (1440–1447), who was founder of the Kingdom of Lo. King Amadpal Bista is from the direct lineage of the greatest king of Tibet, Songtsen Gampo.

Biography
Jigme Dorje Palbar Bista was born in Lo-Manthang Palace in Upper Mustang in the Himalayan Range of Nepal. He was the third son of Colonel H.H. Sri Sri Sri Raja Angun Tenzing Trandul, King of Mustang, by his wife, Kelsang Choeden. He was educated privately at Shigatse, Tibet. He was appointed as the Heir Apparent recognised by the Nepal Government in 1959 A.D. He succeeded as the Head of the Royal House of Lo and to the title of Lo Gyalpo and King of Mustang upon the death of his father H.H. Sri Sri Sri Raja Angun Tenzing Trandul in 1964 A.D and elder brother "H.H. Raja" Angun Palbar in 1968 A.D. Bista is the title given by King of Nepal which means Distinguished Baron in the Nepali language and not the Nepali family name Bista. He was a member of the Raj Sabha between (1964–1990) and a Lieutenant Colonel of Nepalese Army (1964). 

He married a noble lady from Shigatse, Tibet, H.H. Rani Sahiba Sidol Palbar Bista in the 1950s. He had one son, Angun Tenzin, who died at the age of 8, and he later adopted his nephew, Jigme Singhe Palbar Bista (b. 1957).

Honours 
  King Birendra Coronation Medal (24 February 1975).
  King Gyanendra Coronation Medal (4 June 2001).

Ancestry

See also
 Kingdom of Mustang

References

Bibliography
 Paul Raffaele, Il re del Mustang, <Le ultime tribù sulla Terra>, pp. 205–220, fbe edizioni, Trezzano sul Naviglio 2003.

External links
 

Nepalese monarchs
Tibetan Buddhists from Nepal
1930 births
2016 deaths
Deaths from pneumonia in Nepal
21st-century Nepalese nobility
20th-century Nepalese nobility
People from Mustang District